County Road 361 is  long and runs between Nordstraumen and Kjøllefjord in the municipality of Kvænangen in Troms og Finnmark County, Norway. The road branches off of European route E6 and circles around the Sekkemo Marsh to the north and runs along the edge of Kvænang Fjord until connecting with County Road 367. Farms occupy the land descending from the road to the fjord, and the land above the road is covered in low-growing deciduous trees and heather.

References

External links
Statens vegvesen – trafikkmeldinger Fv361 (Traffic Information: County Road 361)

361